, also called  in ancient texts, is an island in Hiroshima Bay located in southwestern Hiroshima Prefecture, Japan.

Geography
The island is roughly T-shaped, with the northern, most mountainous lobe sandwiched between mainland Kure and Etajima island.

Transportation
The island is connected to mainland of Honshu by a pair of bridges over 80 meters wide strait. The island is served by the national route 487. Also, travel by bus is possible since 2005.

Attractions
Katsurahama - one of the 
Kurahashi shipbuilding museum

History
7-8th century - a major center of shipbuilding and port for Yamato period Japan
13th century - an outpost against Wokou pirates for Kamakura period Japan
1709 - island come under government of Hiroshima Domain as an important stop-over on the trade route to Kaminoseki
1860 - coastal artillery fort is built
1 April 1889 - establishment of Kurahashi-jima village
1890 - with the assignment of island to the Kure Naval District, the access to the island is restricted
1 June 1952 - Kurahashi-jima village status is upgraded to "town".
4 December 1961 - first bridge connection to the mainland
1973 - bridge connection to Etajima
2005 - merge of Kurahashi town to Kure

See also
Kurahashi, Hiroshima

Notes and references

This article incorporates material from Japanese Wikipedia page 倉橋島, accessed 14 August 2017

Islands of Hiroshima Prefecture
Geiyo Islands